Dirk Reinier Lippits (born 2 May 1977) is a Dutch rower, born in Geldrop, North Brabant. He won a silver medal in the 2000 Summer Olympics in the Men's Quadruple Sculls. In 2004, Lippits took part in the men's single sculls, finishing fourth in the C Final.

External links
  
 

1977 births
Living people
Dutch male rowers
Olympic medalists in rowing
Olympic rowers of the Netherlands
Olympic silver medalists for the Netherlands
Rowers at the 2000 Summer Olympics
Rowers at the 2004 Summer Olympics
People from Geldrop
Sportspeople from North Brabant
Medalists at the 2000 Summer Olympics
20th-century Dutch people
21st-century Dutch people